Chemda Levy  is a former Israeli wheelchair fencer and wheelchair basketball player. She won eight Paralympic medals: one individual medal in wheelchair fencing, four medals as a member of the women's wheelchair fencing team and three medals, as a member of the women's wheelchair basketball team.

Career

Sport
Levy was active at the Israel Sports Center for the Disabled.

At the 1976 Summer Paralympics, she won a gold medal as a member of the women's foil novice team and a second gold medal as member of the women's wheelchair basketball team.

At the 1980 Summer Paralympics, she won a bronze medal in individual wheelchair fencing and two silver medals as a member the women's teams in wheelchair fencing and in wheelchair basketball.

At the 1984 Summer Paralympics, she won a silver medal in women's wheelchair fencing team and an additional silver medal as a member of the women's wheelchair basketball team.

At the 1988 Summer Paralympics, she won her final bronze medal with the women's wheelchair fencing foil team.

Psychology
Levy is a psychologist who worked at Loewenstein Rehabilitation Hospital and appointed in 2014 to head its center for vocational rehabilitation and training.

Personal life
She married paralympic athlete Moshe Levy.

References

External links
 

Living people
Paralympic wheelchair basketball players of Israel
Paralympic wheelchair fencers of Israel
Wheelchair basketball players at the 1976 Summer Paralympics
Wheelchair basketball players at the 1980 Summer Paralympics
Wheelchair basketball players at the 1984 Summer Paralympics
Wheelchair fencers at the 1976 Summer Paralympics
Wheelchair fencers at the 1980 Summer Paralympics
Wheelchair fencers at the 1984 Summer Paralympics
Wheelchair fencers at the 1988 Summer Paralympics
Medalists at the 1976 Summer Paralympics
Medalists at the 1980 Summer Paralympics
Medalists at the 1984 Summer Paralympics
Medalists at the 1988 Summer Paralympics
Paralympic gold medalists for Israel
Paralympic silver medalists for Israel
Paralympic bronze medalists for Israel